Mason McTavish (born January 30, 2003) is a Swiss professional ice hockey centre for the  Anaheim Ducks of the National Hockey League (NHL). McTavish was selected third overall by the Ducks in the first round of the 2021 NHL Entry Draft. He made his NHL debut with the Ducks in 2021. Internationally McTavish played for the Canadian national team at the 2022 Winter Olympics.

Playing career
McTavish played minor ice hockey for the Pembroke Lumber Kings, where he was coached by his father, Dale McTavish, who also owned the team. He was selected fifth overall in the 2019 OHL Draft by the Peterborough Petes, the same junior team his father played for. In his first year of junior hockey, he finished second among under-17 players in goals before the COVID-19 pandemic shut the season down. The following season, with the OHL season suspended due to the pandemic, McTavish returned to Switzerland, though he was unable to get a work visa until he turned eighteen, eventually joining second division side EHC Olten in February, where he would play thirteen games before returning home to play in the Under-18 World Championships, where he served as captain and scored eleven points in seven games as Canada won the gold medal.

McTavish was selected third overall by the Anaheim Ducks in the 2021 NHL Entry Draft. He signed a three-year, entry-level contract with the Ducks on August 13, 2021. He was initially scheduled to not play in the team's opening day game against the Winnipeg Jets but was added to the lineup just hours before the contest. In his NHL debut, McTavish scored his first career goal and recorded an assist in a 4–1 win. At 18 years, 256 days old, he surpassed Oleg Tverdovsky as the youngest Duck to score a goal. McTavish skated in three games before a lower-body injury forced him out of the lineup. He was assigned to the Ducks' American Hockey League (AHL) affiliate, the San Diego Gulls, on a conditioning loan on October 28. He recorded two points in three games for the Gulls while with the club. McTavish finished with two goals and one assist in nine games overall for the Ducks before being re-assigned to the Petes on November 20. With not having exceeded the nine-game mark, the Ducks did not burn a year off of McTavish's entry-level contract.

McTavish appeared in 5 games with the Petes, posting 6 goals and 7 points before he was traded to contending club, the Hamilton Bulldogs, in exchange for two prospects and 6 draft selections on January 9, 2022.

International play

McTavish made his international debut with Canada's U18 team at the 2021 IIHF World U18 Championships in Texas. He tallied five goals and six assists in seven games, while Team Canada won the gold medal. Later in the year he was invited to join the roster for the national junior team in advance of the 2022 World Junior Ice Hockey Championships. However, the tournament was cancelled after Team Canada had played two games, as a result of the spread of the Omicron variant. Shortly afterward, McTavish was selected to play for Team Canada at the 2022 Winter Olympics, the NHL having declined to allow its players to take part. He was part of the team's first line alongside veteran Eric Staal and AHLer Josh Ho-Sang, but Team Canada struggled in the tournament and was eliminated in the quarter-finals. When the International Ice Hockey Federation revived the cancelled 2022 World Junior Championships in August of 2022, McTavish was again on the roster, and this time was named captain of the team in the absence of Kaiden Guhle. In an August 11 group stage game against Team Slovakia, McTavish scored four goals as part of an 11–1 victory, tying a record for most goals scored by a Canadian player in a single World Junior game. Team Canada advanced to the gold medal game against Team Finland, where McTavish had his most significant moment of the tournament in overtime, using his stick to knock Finnish defenceman Topi Niemelä's potential game-winning shot out of midair onto the goal line, preventing a loss. Dubbed "the McTavish Miracle," it was considered an exceptionally skilled defensive play, and facilitated Canada's victory minutes later. McTavish was named the tournament MVP and one of Canada's three best players.

Personal life
McTavish was born in Switzerland while his father, Dale, was playing for SC Rapperswil-Jona. He first began playing ice hockey in Zug before the family returned to Canada when Mason was eight years old following Dale's retirement. The family settled in Carp. He has one older brother, Darian.

Career statistics

Regular season and playoffs

International

Awards and honours

References

External links
 

2003 births
Living people
Anaheim Ducks draft picks
Anaheim Ducks players
Canadian ice hockey centres
EHC Olten players
Hamilton Bulldogs (OHL) players
National Hockey League first-round draft picks
Peterborough Petes (ice hockey) players
San Diego Gulls (AHL) players
Ice hockey people from Zürich
Swiss emigrants to Canada
Ice hockey players at the 2022 Winter Olympics
Olympic ice hockey players of Canada